HMDW Architects is an architectural firm based in London and Chichester. The practice is led by Principal Russell Hanslip, and Directors Simon Dyson and Nick Weedon.

The firm specialises in listed buildings, and performs quinquennial inspections for many churches in the south east. The Directors are AABC registered.

It has restored, and reworked buildings that originally date back to the eleventh century, and has been involved in the centenary renovation of the Phoenix Cinema, London's oldest continuously running cinema.

Recent projects

All Saints Church, Wandsworth
St Andrews Church, Earlsfield, hard landscaping
St Augustine's Church, Highbury, renovation
Chapel Royal, Brighton
Holy Trinity, South Wimbledon
Ifield Friends Meeting House, Restoration and repairs
St Jude's Church, Kensington, crypt excavation, hard landscaping, internal restoration and renovation
St John the Baptist, Kingston Vale, Extension
St Luke's Church, Redcliffe Gardens, crypt excavation, hard landscaping, nave restoration and renovation
St Luke's Church, Oseney Crescent Renovation from dereliction into use
St Mary & St Gabriel, South Harting, extension
St Mary's, Portsea, Portsmouth, the main medieval church of the city, restoration of tower stonework
St Mary's Church, Horsham, Extension
St Nicolas, Middleton-on-Sea, new extension
St Paul's, Mill Hill, extension, crypt excavation, nave restoration and renovation
Pembroke House, Walworth, Restoration
St Peter's Church, Walworth Crypt excavation and Nave restoration of a John Soane Church, now housing the 'Inspire' Community Facility
Phoenix Cinema, East Finchley, Centenary Restoration project

Gallery

External Press & Awards

St Jude's Church, Kensington features in Church Building & Heritage Review issue 140, Mar/Apr 2013.
King of Prussia Gold Medal 2012 for Conservation repairs to the Chapel Royal, Brighton.
The Phoenix Cinema Centenary Restoration features in Church Building & Heritage Review issue 133 p36.
Reopening of the Phoenix Cinema on BBC News
St Peter's Walworth as a case study on the Churchcare website
Dunorlan Park boatstore, winner of the 2004 Kent Design Award
St Mary Portsea tower stonework restoration reported in the Portsmouth News
Sussex Heritage Trust Award (2010) for St Mary's Church Horsham extension

References

External links
HMDW Architects website
The Phoenix Cinema website
St Augustine's Church website
The Ecclesiastical Architects & Surveyors Association, of which Russell Hanslip was President, 2007/8
Church Building Magazine

Architecture firms of England
Architecture firms of the United Kingdom